Presidential elections were held in El Salvador on 5 March 1967. The result was a victory for Fidel Sánchez Hernández of the Party of National Conciliation, who won 54.4 percent of the vote.

Results

References

Bibliography
Anderson, Thomas P. Matanza: El Salvador's communist revolt of 1932. Lincoln: University of Nebraska Press. 1971.
Benítez Manaut, Raúl. "El Salvador: un equilibrio imperfecto entre los votos y las botas." Secuencia 17:71-92 (mayo-agosto de 1990). 
Eguizábal, Cristina. "El Salvador: elecciones sin democracia." Polemica (Costa Rica) 14/15:16-33 (marzo-junio 1984). 1984.
Kantor, Harry. Patterns of politics and political systems in Latin America. Chicago: Rand McNally & Company. 1969.
Montgomery, Tommie Sue. 1995. Revolution in El Salvador: from civil strife to civil peace. Boulder: Westview.
Political Handbook of the world, 1967. New York, 1968. 
Webre, Stephen. José Napoleón Duarte and the Christian Democratic Party in Salvadoran Politics 1960-1972. Baton Rouge: Louisiana State University Press. 1979.
Williams, Philip J. and Knut Walter. Militarization and demilitarization in El Salvador's transition to democracy. Pittsburgh: University of Pittsburgh Press. 1997.

El Salvador
Presidential elections in El Salvador
1967 in El Salvador
Election and referendum articles with incomplete results